Ledigos is a municipality located in the province of Palencia, Castile and León, Spain. According to the 2004 census (INE), the municipality has a population of 96 inhabitants.

Ledigos in the movies 
 2005 : Saint-Jacques ... La Mecque directed by Coline Serreau

References

Municipalities in the Province of Palencia